Pang Chi Hang (born 3 September 1993) is a Macau footballer who plays as a midfielder or forward for Chao Pak Kei.

Career

Pang started his career with Macau third division side Lai Chi. After that, he played for Ka I in the Macau top flight.

In 2017, he trialed for Hong Kong club Yuen Long, before working as a sports journalist.

References

External links
 
 Pang Chi Hang at playmakerstats.com

Macau international footballers
Living people
Macau footballers
1993 births
Association football forwards
Association football midfielders
Windsor Arch Ka I players
G.D. Lam Pak players
S.L. Benfica de Macau players
Chao Pak Kei players
Liga de Elite players